Dark Waters (also known as Dead Waters in the American home-video edition), is a 1994 horror film directed by Mariano Baino, who co-wrote it with Andy Bark and also served as the editor.

Plot
A young woman named Elizabeth (Louise Salter) arrives at an island convent during a heavy rainstorm. Her father has recently died, leaving her an orphan. She has returned to the island of her birth in order to determine whether to continue her father's donations to the convent. She meets the ancient Mother Superior, who is blind. In lieu of a past friend of Elizabeth's, she is instead met by an innocent-seeming novice named Sarah, who will be her guide. Elizabeth tells Sarah that she was born on the island and lived there until she was seven. Her mother had died while giving birth to her.

Elizabeth and Sarah visit a decaying library located in the convent. They look at an illustration of a demon and a painting which shows two young girls and a pagan amulet. They are temporarily separated. Elizabeth is attacked by a nun, who dies by falling out a window. Elizabeth discovers an entrance into a labyrinth of catacomb. Here, a procession of nuns carries a bloody corpse wrapped in a sheet. Elizabeth, who has gotten lost, finds a pit-like room where a blind painter has covered the walls and canvases with enigmatic images. She recognizes one of the faces on the wall as that of her missing friend. The body the nuns were carrying might well have been her corpse.

The next day: Elizabeth has come to distrust Sarah. The former now has strange dreams and visions. Elizabeth goes to her childhood home and questions the old woman who cared for her as a child. Their meeting is interrupted when the nuns set fire to the house. Elizabeth alone escapes. Back at the convent, dead and dying nuns are everywhere. In the catacombs, Elizabeth is approached by Sarah. The latter removes the top of her cassock to reveal that much of her body is not human. Sarah is Elizabeth's sister, who more closely resembles their demon mother. The nuns had attempted to prevent Elizabeth from realizing her heritage and freeing their mother from the crypt.

Sarah and Elizabeth begin the ritual, just as they had as children. The pieces of the shattered amulet are placed on the ground by a nun, who they make into a human sacrifice. Drops of blood restores the broken amulet. Their demon mother begins to break free of her prison. As she had when young, Elizabeth, now afraid, throws the amulet down. It shatters once more into pieces. Sarah goes to the demon mother. Elizabeth escapes.

Elizabeth joins the convent. She wears a necklace made of the central fragment of the shattered amulet, and her eyes, covered in cataracts, now resemble those of the blind Mother Superior.

Cast
Louise Salter as Elizabeth
Venera Simmons as Sarah
Maria Kapnist as Mother Superior

Production

The film was originally based on a short story by Andy Bark, inspired by a childhood visit to Staithes in North Yorkshire. Many years later, having worked as editor on Mariano's film, Caruncula, he mentioned that he was working on a script called Dark Waters and he and Mariano began to work on it together.

The film, perhaps the first Western film to be shot in Ukraine following the collapse of the Soviet Union, was difficult and troubled one. The system there created many problems, but provided spectacular yet cheap sets and locations that would have been impossible to get in the UK.  The political situation tried its best to halt the production. In the early days, when finance was being sought by Bark and Mariano, a coup attempt that saw tanks on the streets of Moscow could not have helped matters.  There was even another coup at the end of filming when Mariano, in Moscow for the dubbing, was awoken by gun fire.

In Chapter 5 of his autobiography Its Only A Movie, Mark Kermode gives a detailed account of his attempts to file a set report on the movie, which were constantly frustrated by travel problems in and around Ukraine.

Release
A Blu-ray version was released on April 11, 2017 in North America.

Reception
Jon Condit from Dread Central awarded the film a score of 4 out of 5, commending the film's atmosphere.
Robert Firsching from Allmovie offered the film similar praise, writing, "the most exciting genre debut of the decade, Dark Waters is a stylish, frightening occult film with the Lovecraftian overtones of Lucio Fulci and the visual flair of Dario Argento, pointing to its creator, Mariano Baino, as perhaps the next great Italian horror director."

References

External links
 
 
 

1994 films
1994 horror films
1990s supernatural horror films
British supernatural horror films
Demons in film
Films about nuns
Films set on islands
Films shot in Ukraine
Gothic horror films
Russian supernatural horror films
1990s English-language films
1990s British films